The Clinger–Cohen Act of 1996 encompasses two laws that were together passed as part of the National Defense Authorization Act for Fiscal Year 1996 (NDA):

 The Federal Acquisition Reform Act of 1996 was Division D of the NDA
 The Information Technology Management Reform Act of 1996 was Division E of the NDA

References 

United States federal government administration legislation